Laxmibai College of Physical Education Ground is a multi purpose stadium in Gwalior, Madhya Pradesh. The ground is mainly used for organizing matches of football, cricket and other sports.  The stadium has facilities for various sports like cricket, football, hockey etc. There is also an astroturf field for hockey which is used for various hockey event. In addition to this there is a swimming pool and a Cycling Velodrome.

The stadium hosted two first-class matches  in 1943 when Gwalior cricket team played against Delhi cricket team  and again in 1970 when Madhya Pradesh cricket team played against Vidarbha cricket team.

The ground also hosted a List A match between Madhya Pradesh cricket team against Railways cricket team but since then the stadium has hosted non-first-class cricket matches.

References

External links 
 cricketarchive
 cricinfo

Sports venues in Madhya Pradesh
Cricket grounds in Madhya Pradesh
Sports venues in Gwalior
1940 establishments in India